Dysbiota is a genus of flies in the family Stratiomyidae.

Species
Dysbiota parvula Lindner, 1958
Dysbiota peregrina (Hutton, 1901)

References

Stratiomyidae
Brachycera genera
Taxa named by Erwin Lindner
Diptera of Australasia